Holby City is a British medical drama television series that was broadcast on BBC One in the United Kingdom between 12 January 1999 and 29 March 2022. The series was created by Tony McHale and Mal Young as a spin-off from the BBC medical drama Casualty, which is set in the emergency department of the Holby City Hospital, based in the fictitious town of Holby. The show focuses on the lives, both professional and personal, of the medical and ancillary staff on the hospital's surgical wards. It is primarily filmed at the BBC Elstree Centre in Borehamwood. Young wanted to explore what happened to patients treated in Casualty once they were taken away to the hospital's surgical wards. He opined that Casualty limited itself to "accident of the week" storylines, while Holby City allowed the possibility of storylines about long-term care, rather than immediate life-and-death decisions. A police procedural spin-off, HolbyBlue, began airing from 8 May 2007, running for two series before being cancelled due to poor viewing figures. The spin-off features a crossover with Holby City in its second series.

The show has aired twenty-three full series. The drama reached its 1000th episode on 5 November 2019, and was cancelled in June 2021. The first series of Holby City ran for nine episodes, which was increased to sixteen and thirty episodes for the second and third series respectively. Subsequent series contain fifty-two episodes and were broadcast on a weekly basis. Young associated the rise of episodes with the show's success. Some series have additional episodes: series ten and twenty-one contain fifty-three episodes, series twelve contains fifty-five episodes, and series nineteen contains sixty-four episodes, due to internal BBC reasons. Series twenty-two contains a reduced forty-four episodes following a four-month production break due to the COVID-19 pandemic. The following series was also reduced to fifty episodes.

For the first series, episodes were 50 minutes in length. Since then, episodes have mostly been approximately an hour in length. Episode lengths were temporarily reduced to 40 minutes midway through series 22 as a result of the COVID-19 pandemic. The show was originally broadcast on Tuesday nights in the 8.10 pm, before moving to Thursday nights in the 8pm timeslot from the second series. Midway through series three, broadcast reverted to Tuesday nights, now in the 8.05 pm timeslot. It was later moved to an 8pm timeslot from the fourth series. Holby City temporarily returned to the Thursday night timeslot for two months during series nine, allowing HolbyBlue to air in its usual timeslot. As a consequence of episodes being reduced to 40 minutes, the serial was moved to a 7.50 pm timeslot.

Series overview

Episodes

Series 1 (1999)

Series 2 (1999–2000)

Series 3 (2000–2001)

Series 4 (2001–2002)

Series 5 (2002−2003)

Series 6 (2003–2004)

Series 7 (2004–2005)

Series 8 (2005–2006)

Series 9 (2006–2007)

Series 10 (2007–2008)

Series 11 (2008–2009)

Series 12 (2009–2010)

Series 13 (2010–2011)

Series 14 (2011–2012)

Series 15 (2012–2013)

Series 16 (2013–2014)

Series 17 (2014–2015)

Series 18 (2015–2016)

Series 19 (2016–2017)

Series 20 (2018)

Series 21 (2019)

Series 22 (2020–2021)

Series 23 (2021–2022)

Specials

Making It At Holby 
Making It At Holby is a documentary which explores the creation and casting of Holby City characters Donna Jackson (Jaye Jacobs) and Mickie Hendrie (Kelly Adams) as well as Casualty character Steve (Simon Kassianides). It was commissioned as part of BBC Talent Week, which focuses on new BBC talent and content across a week. It was broadcast on 23 March 2004, during the same week that the characters debut on screen. The documentary follows the audition process through to the first days of filming. It also features cast members from Holby City and Casualty discussing receiving their "TV breaks" on the dramas. The documentary chronicles Jacobs being mentored by actress Jan Pearson (Kath Fox), Hendrie by actor Ian Aspinall (Mubbs Hussein) and Kassianides by actor James Redmond (Abs Denham). David Chater of The Times listed Making It At Holby in the television highlights for its day of broadcast.

Casualty@Holby City

Footnotes

References

Bibliography

External links 
 List of Holby City episodes at BBC Online
 

Holby City
Holby City
Holby City
Episodes